Sankofa is an Adinkra concept of "roots", symbolized by a bird with its head turned backwards

Sankofa may also refer to:

Sankofa (film), 1993
Sankofa (novel), 2021
Sankofa Film and Video Collective 
Sankofa Television, a subsidiary of African Communications Foundation, based in Amsterdam, The Netherlands 
"Sankofa", a song from the album Blue Light 'til Dawn by Cassandra Wilson
Sankofa (oogenus), an oogenus of bird-like eggs of a dinosaur species

People:
Mika'il Sankofa, U.S. sabre fencer and coach
Norman Sankofa, a fictional character on the British television soap opera Hollyoaks
Osei Sankofa, an English footballer
Shaka Sankofa, a Texas death-row inmate sentenced in 1981
Theo Sankofa, a fictional character on the long British television soap opera Hollyoaks